Drago Žigman (12 June 1924 – 8 November 1983) was a Croatian and Yugoslav professional footballer.

Career
Žigman played the position of forward for local Zagreb sides NK Mesarski and Lokomotiva Zagreb, as well as for FK Sarajevo. He was the latter's top scorer during the 1950–51 season. After retiring from professional football, Žigman managed Borac Zagreb for a few years.

References

1924 births
1983 deaths
Footballers from Zagreb
Association football forwards
Yugoslav footballers
Croatian footballers
NK Lokomotiva Zagreb players
FK Sarajevo players
Yugoslav First League players
Yugoslav football managers